Karanganyar Regency is a regency in the Indonesian province of Central Java. It covers an area of 773.79 km2 and had a population of 813,196 at the 2010 Census and 931,963 at the 2020 Census. Its capital is the town of Karanganyar.

Geography
Karanganyar Regency is located in the south east of Central Java, Indonesia. It is near Magetan Regency (in East Java Province) in the east, Sragen Regency in the north, Wonogiri Regency and Sukoharjo Regency in the south, and Surakarta (Solo) and Boyolali Regency in the west. The exclave of Colomadu borders Surakarta (Solo) to the east, Boyolali Regency to the north and west, and Sukoharjo Regency to the south.

Karanganyar is located between 110°40′E and 110°70′E and between 7°28′S and 7°46′S; the average height is 511 meters above sea level.

Karanganyar Regency covers 77,379 hectares (2015 data), which consists of rice fields (21,965 hectares) and dry ground (55,413 hectares). The rice field consists of irrigated area (7,872 hectares), divided into a technical irrigation system area (6,144 hectares), simple irrigation area (7,134 hectares), and rain fall rice field (1,693 hectares). Meanwhile, areas provided for buildings are 20,732 hectares. Areas for gardening are 17,937 hectares, plantation is 3,251 hectares.

Administrative Districts
Karanganyar Regency comprises seventeen districts (kecamatan), tabulated below with their areas and their populations at the 2010 Census and the 2020 Census. The table also includes the number of administrative villages (rural desa and urban kelurahan) in each district and its post code.

Notes: (a) except the desa of Kadipiro (which has a post code of 57716).(b) except the desa of Dukuh (which has a post code of 57731).(c) except the desa of Harjosari (which has a post code of 57715).(d) except the desa of Munggur (which has a post code of 57716).(e) except the desa of Karangrejo (which has a post code of 57711).

Population
The Regency had a population on 813,196 at the 2010 Census, an increase of 51,171 since the previous census in 2000. In 2020 it had 931,963 inhabitants, comprising 464,784 male and 467,179 female.

Education
Based on data from the Culture and Education Department of the Karanganyar Regency, in 2005 there were: 489 primary schools; 7 private primary schools; 49 general secondary schools; 27 private secondary schools; 12 senior high schools; 5 private senior high schools; 2 SMKN units and 22 private vocation schools.

The number of students of primary schools were 81,057 students with 4,483 teachers, which made the student-teacher ratio 1 : 18.08. The numbers of junior high-schools were 37,558 students with 2,818 teachers, with a student-teacher ratio of 1 : 13.33. There were 20,507 high-school students, with 1,639 teachers, which made the student-teacher ratio 1 : 12.51.

Health
Based on data from the Karanganyar Regency Health Bureau in 2005, the number of health facilities consisted of: 3 hospitals, 21 Public Health Centres, 60 Secondary Public Health Centres, 28 nursing-midwiferies, and 30 Clinics. Figures for health-workers: there were 80 physicians, 24 dentists, 275 midwives, and 241 nurses.

Religion
There are 1,821 Mosques, 679 small mosques, 127 Churches, 12 Temples and 1 Vihara.

Heritage & Tourism
Karanganyar is also home of the Mangadeg hill (also known as Truloroyo) Mangkunegaran royal burial complex built upon a small mountain. In the immediate vicinity are the Pablengan ruins of ritual bathing pools, fed by seven natural springs. Several hundred metres away is the mausoleum complex of former President Suharto Astana Giribangun as well as the alleged final resting place of legendary Javanese leader Raden Mas Samboernowo at the peak of this same hill, titled Argosari.

There are a substantial number of especially Javanese tourists who visit the Mangadeg and Argosari cemeteries to pray to Samboernowo for assistance in life, particularly business or political affairs, in line with the Kejawen or Kebatinan ancestor-worship/shamanic belief system.

Karanganyar also has a great waterfall called "Grojogan Sewu", which means "thousand water fall", located in Tawangmangu District.

Bio-pharmaceutical Center
April 2011: The research and technology ministry is sponsoring the formation of a bio-pharmaceutical center in Karanganyar Regency to improve the cultivation and post-harvest products of local farmer such as ginger, turmeric, black wild ginger, kencur.

References

Further reading
Statistics for Kranganyar Regency, various Indonesian governmental Departments including Departemen Budaya dan Edukasi and Departamen Pertanian, 2005 figures.
Indonesia.  Vaisulis, Justine. Lonely Planet, 2007.   (softcover).
Indonesia. Backshall, Robert. Rough Guides (Penguin publishing), 2nd edition, 2003, pp251.  (softcover)

Regencies of Central Java
Solo River